Huarijio (Huarijío in Spanish; also spelled Guarijío, Varihío, and Warihío) is a Uto-Aztecan language of the states of Chihuahua and Sonora in northwestern Mexico. It is spoken by around 2,100 Huarijio people, most of whom are monolinguals.

Distribution
The language has two variants, known as Mountain Guarijio (guarijío de la sierra) and River Guarijio (guarijío del río). The mountain variant is spoken in the Chihuahuan municipalities of Chínipas (settlements of Agua Caliente, Arroyo de la Yerba, Benjamín M. Chaparro (Santa Ana), Chínipas de Almada, El Manzanillal, El Trigo de Russo (El Trigo), El Triguito, Guazizaco, Ignacio Valenzuela (Loreto), Los Alamillos de Loreto, Los Llanitos, and Los Pinos), Moris (settlements of Bermudez, Casa Quemada, El Campo Mayo, El Gavilán, El Pilar, El Saucito (De Beltrán), La Cieneguita de Rodríguez, La Finca de Pesqueira, Los Terreros, Mesa Colorada, Moris, Río Santa María, Santa María Grande, Sierra Obscura (El Serruchito), and Trompa), and Uruachi (settlements of Arechuyvo (Arechuivo), Aremeyvo, Arroyo Seco, Batopilillas, Boca Arroyo del Carrizo (Hornitos), Cachabachi, Cerro Blanco, Cuiteco, Chacharachi, Chagayvo, Chiltepín, El Barro, El Bosque, El Carrizo, El Cuzal, El Metate, El Pinito, El Revaje, Gosogachi, Guasaremos, Jecopaco, Jicamorachi, La Barranca, La Cueva de Diego, La Cumbre, La Mesa de Cereachi, La Nopalera, La Reforma, Las Pilas, Los Hornitos, Los Lajeros, Los Laureles, Mesa Quemada, Mocorichi de Arriba, Noriego, Pacayvo, Palmarito (Agua Caliente), San Juan, San Luis, Saucillo de Rico, Sipachi, Tesos, Tojiachi de Abajo, Toribisachi, Uruachi, and Venustiano Carranza (San Luis de Babarocos)).

The river variant is found in the Sonoran municipalities of Álamos (settlements of Bavícora, Burapaco, Casas Coloradas, Chorijoa, El Chalate, El Sauz, Guajaray, Huataturi, Jobeg I, La Sauceda, La Tribuna, Los Estrados, Mesa Colorada, Mochibampo, Ranch Nuevo, San Bernardo, Sejaqui, and Tecoripa) and Quiriego (settlements of Batacosa, El Frijolar, Los Bajíos (Ejido los Conejos), and Quiriego).

Speakers of Mountain Guarijio self-identify as Warihó and call River Guarijio speakers macurawe or makulái. River Guarijio speakers call themselves Warihío and call Mountain speakers "tarahumaras". Contact between the two groups is scant and, although the linguistic differences between the two are slight, speakers report that mutual comprehension is difficult.

Morphology
Guarijio is an agglutinative language, where words are morphologically complex to accomplish various grammatical purposes, i.e. several morphemes are strung together. The Guarijio language typologically has the tendency to show a final verb order. However, the word order in Guarijio is rather free (Miller, 1996).

Phonology
The consonant inventory includes:

The vowel inventory includes: /i/, /e/, /a/, /o/, /u/.

Media
Programming in Guarijio is carried by the CDI's radio station XEETCH, broadcasting from Etchojoa, Sonora.

References

External links

Lengua Guarijio (In Spanish)

Agglutinative languages
Southern Uto-Aztecan languages
Endangered languages
Indigenous languages of Mexico
Indigenous languages of the North American Southwest
Object–verb–subject languages